Microgyne is a genus of flowering plants belonging to the family Asteraceae.

Its native range is Uruguay to Argentina.

Species
Species:

Microgyne marchesiana 
Microgyne trifurcata

References

Astereae
Asteraceae genera